"You've Got a Good Love Comin'" is a song written by Van Stephenson, Jeff Silbar and Danny Morrison, and originally recorded by Stephenson on his 1981 album "China Girl".  It was later released in December 1984 by American country music artist Lee Greenwood as the third single and title track from his album You've Got a Good Love Comin'.  Greenwood's version reached #9 on the Billboard Hot Country Singles & Tracks chart.

Other versions 
The song was also recorded by Conway Twitty on his 1983 album Lost in the Feeling.

Chart performance

Van Stephenson

Lee Greenwood

References

1985 singles
Conway Twitty songs
Lee Greenwood songs
Songs written by Danny Morrison (songwriter)
Songs written by Jeff Silbar
Songs written by Van Stephenson
MCA Records singles
1981 songs
Song recordings produced by Jerry Crutchfield